Ergys Kuçi (born 29 October 1993 in Vlorë) is an Albanian professional footballer who plays for Oriku in the Albanian First Division.

References

1993 births
Living people
Footballers from Vlorë
Albanian footballers
Association football defenders
Flamurtari Vlorë players
KF Himara players
KF Bylis Ballsh players
KF Butrinti players
KF Apolonia Fier players
KF Oriku players
Kategoria Superiore players
Kategoria e Parë players